Will Glover a.k.a. Willie Glover is a musician and songwriter from Southern California. He was a member of the surf group The Pyramids. He has the distinction of being one of the very few or possibly the only black musician in surf music.

Background
Glover was born in North Carolina. His father was a career navy man and the family moved around a bit until they finally settled in Long Beach, California. The family lived on Santa Fe Avenue in a naval house. His father wanted him to make his career in the military but Glover had different ideas and when he was 12 he told father no! He'd already been singing at boy scouts and playing the guitar since he was 9 years old.

According to The History of Surfing by  Matt Warshaw, Glover is surf music's only black musician. In addition to his uniqueness of being black in surf music, he was also a left-handed guitar player.<ref>You'll never hear surf music again''' Notes: 14. “Penetration.” — Jay Thompson</ref>

Career

The Pyramids
Originally from Long Beach, the Pyramids were made up of Skip Mercier lead guitar, Glover rhythm guitar, Steve Leonard bass guitar, Ken McMullen drums and Tom Pitman on saxophone.

They were formed in 1962 by Glover and fellow Long Beach Polytechnic High student Mercier who were teaching each other songs by The Ventures. Having established the band, they would arrive at venues by unusual means like in a helicopter while acts like The Beach Boys would arrive by limousine.

As a songwriter he wrote "Here Comes Marsha" which was the B side to their 1963 hit single "Penetration". He also wrote "I Don't Wanna Cry" for the group.The illustrated discography of hot rod music, 1961-1965 – John Blair, Stephen J. McParland Page 54 Pyramids

Post Pyramids
After the demise of the Pyramids in the 1960s, Glover carried playing into the 1970s. He was a member of a club group called The Family Cat whose members were Long Beach musicians Mike Marchman, Jim Foelber and Chris Myers. Other members were Skip Mercier and Steve Leonard. They played in nightclubs around the Orange County district. The Family Cat carried on until 1973.

By the time he was married and had moved to a ranch in a Riverside, he had left the music business. Looking for a steady income Glover worked at various jobs, which included working at a gas station and, later, he started his own construction company.

Later years
In the late 1980s, and not having played in years, he was taken by a friend to see Jann Browne. Having his interest in singing reignited he was invited by Browne to sit in with her. He also entered some talent contests which gained a following for him in Country music. From there, he carried on with his career.

In the mid-1990s, Glover was still running his own construction and demolition business.

In 2019, Glover along with Bob Berryhill of The Surfaris, Bob Spickard of The Chantays and other surf musicians were selected to play at the benefit at The Coach House in San Juan Capistrano, California on Saturday May 25 to honor Dick Dale.Pacific Longboarder Magazine, 30 May 19 - Concert and paddle-out for Dick Dale – surf rocker remembered at Orange County

Solo recordings
Glover's solo debut was Standing in the Line of Fire was first released in 1997 had a folk roots style to it. It contained the songs "In Times Like These", which was done in a style similar to the Doobie Brothers and a romping blues style song called "Cold Hearted Lover". His second album was The Will Glover Experience'' which was released in 2014.

Venues

1990s
Along with the Kari Gaffney Band and the Anthony Rivera Band, he played the Coach House at San Juan Capistrano, California in March 1997. Along with James Intveld and Chris Gaffney, Glover was headlining at the Crazy Horse Steak House on Tuesday nights starting from mid-May. On October 19, 1999, he was appearing at the Crazy Horse again.

2000s
On December 10, 2013, Glover was to appear at Clubhouse 3 performing a tribute to Chuck Berry, who he had performed with in the past.

Discography

References

External links
 Website
 Discogs: Willie Glover

African-American country musicians
African-American guitarists
American country singer-songwriters
American male guitarists
American rock guitarists
Lead guitarists
Rhythm guitarists
Surf musicians
Living people
Year of birth missing (living people)
African-American male singer-songwriters
21st-century African-American male singers
Long Beach Polytechnic High School alumni